The 1935 New South Wales state election was for 90 electoral districts each returning a single member with compulsory preferential voting.

Results by electoral district

Albury

Annandale

Armidale

Arncliffe

Ashburnham

Ashfield 

 Preferences were not distributed.

Auburn

Balmain 

 Preferences were not distributed.

Bankstown 

 Preferences were not distributed.

Barwon

Bathurst

Bondi

Botany

Bulli

Burwood 

 Preferences were not distributed.

Byron 

 Preferences were not distributed.

Canterbury 

 Preferences were not distributed.

Casino

Castlereagh

Cessnock 

 Preferences were not distributed.

Clarence 

 Preferences were not distributed.

Cobar

Concord 

 Preferences were not distributed.

Coogee

Cootamundra

Corowa

Croydon 

 Preferences were not distributed.

Drummoyne

Dubbo

Dulwich Hill

Georges River 

 Preferences were not distributed.

Glebe

Gloucester

Gordon

Goulburn

Granville

Hamilton

Hartley

Hawkesbury

Hornsby

Hurstville 

 Preferences were not distributed.

Illawarra 

 Preferences were not distributed.

King 

 Preferences were not distributed.

Kogarah 

 Preferences were not distributed.

Kurri Kurri

Lachlan

Lakemba 

 Preferences were not distributed.

Lane Cove

Leichhardt

Lismore

Liverpool Plains

Maitland

Manly

Marrickville

Monaro

Mosman

Mudgee

Murray

Murrumbidgee

Namoi

Nepean

Neutral Bay

Newcastle 

 Preferences were not distributed.

Newtown 

 Preferences were not distributed.

North Sydney 

 Preferences were not distributed.

Orange

Oxley

Paddington 

 Preferences were not distributed.

Parramatta 

 Preferences were not distributed.

Petersham

Phillip

Raleigh

Randwick 

 Preferences were not distributed.

Redfern

Ryde

South Coast 

 Preferences were not distributed.

Sturt

Tamworth

Temora

Tenterfield

Upper Hunter 

 Preferences were not distributed.

Vaucluse

Wagga Wagga

Waratah 

 Preferences were not distributed.

Waverley 

 Preferences were not distributed.

Willoughby

Wollondilly

Woollahra

Yass

Young

See also 
 Candidates of the 1935 New South Wales state election
 Members of the New South Wales Legislative Assembly, 1935–1938

Notes

References 

1935